Bourem Cercle is an administrative subdivision of the Gao Region of north-eastern Mali. The administrative center (chef-lieu) is the town of Bourem.

The cercle is divided into five communes:

Bamba
Bourem
Taboye
Tarkint
Temera

References

Cercles of Mali
Gao Region